The 1989–90 Indiana Hoosiers men's basketball team represented Indiana University. Their head coach was Bobby Knight, who was in his 19th year. The team played its home games in Assembly Hall in Bloomington, Indiana, and was a member of the Big Ten Conference.

The Hoosiers finished the regular season with an overall record of 18–11 and a conference record of 8–10, finishing 7th in the Big Ten Conference. The Hoosiers were invited to participate in the 1990 NCAA tournament as an 8-seed; however, IU made a quick exit with a first-round loss to 9-seed California.

Roster

Schedule/Results

|-
!colspan=8| Regular Season
|-

|-
!colspan=8| NCAA tournament

References

1989-90
1989–90 Big Ten Conference men's basketball season
Indiana
1989 in sports in Indiana
1990 in sports in Indiana